"Mon amour" (English: "My Love") is a song by Belgian musician Stromae and Cuban-American singer/songwriter Camila Cabello. It was released on 27 July 2022, as the fourth single from Stromae's album Multitude, which was released on 4 March 2022. It was written by the two artists and Luc Van Haver, brother of Stromae. It was produced by Stromae, his brother Luc Van Haver, and Moon Willis.

A Love Island-inspired music video, directed by the director duo Julien & Quentin, was released on 27 July 2022.

Critical reception
Jon Pareles of The New York Times ranked the song 14th in the best songs of 2022 list.

Charts

Weekly charts

Year-end charts

Certifications

References

2022 singles
2022 songs
Stromae songs
Camila Cabello songs
Songs written by Stromae
Songs written by Camila Cabello